Green Left–Initiative for the Valencian Country (EV–IPV) or just Green Left (EV) was a political party in the Valencian Community founded in May 2001 from the Nova Esquerra (NE) faction within the Democratic Party of the New Left (PDNI). It was led by Valencian MP Joan Francesc Peris, previously a member from United Left of the Valencian Country (EUPV), who had been elected in the 1999 Valencian regional election in the PSOE–PDNI electoral alliance.

The party contested the 2003 Valencian regional and 2004 Spanish general elections in alliance with the Valencian Nationalist Bloc (Bloc), but failed to gain any seat. EV–IPV subsequently merged with The Greens branch in the Valencian Community (EV/LV) and Alternative Left of Buñol (IAB) to form The Greens of the Valencian Country (EVPV) in November 2004.

References

2001 establishments in Spain
2004 disestablishments in Spain
Defunct political parties in Spain
Green political parties in Spain
Political parties established in 2001
Political parties disestablished in 2004